The Texas dip is a form of elaborate curtsey and prostration performed in Texas during debutante balls. It involves the woman extending her arms completely to either side and lowering herself fully so that one knee touches the floor while simultaneously bowing her head to the side so that her left ear touches her lap. The Texas dip is believed to have originated in about 1909.

See also
 Drum major backbend
 Kowtow
 debutante

References

External links
 video of a woman performing a Texas dip during the introduction of debutantes in Laredo, Texas
Gestures of respect
Bowing
Texas culture